All About Aubrey is a reality television series from Oxygen that premiered on March 7, 2011. The show follows pop star Aubrey O'Day as she mounts a solo comeback after being fired from multi-platinum girl group Danity Kane by Sean Combs on MTV's Making the Band. The show was not renewed for a second season due to low ratings.

Cast 
Aubrey O'Day – a multi-platinum singer, dancer, actress, songwriter, and former member of the girl group Danity Kane.
Stephanie Spiropoulos – one of Aubrey's childhood best friends.
Tiffany Palladine – Aubrey's best friend since the 5th grade.
Krystal Bronson – Aubrey's roommate and assistant.
DJ Eque – Aubrey's friend and a celebrity DJ.
Johnny Wright – Aubrey's manager. Johnny has helped build the careers of stars such as Justin Timberlake, Britney Spears and the Jonas Brothers.
Adonis Shropshire – Aubrey's record producer.
Gil – Aubrey's choreographer.

Episode list

External links

References 

2010s American reality television series
2011 American television series debuts
2011 American television series endings
Oxygen (TV channel) original programming